Dolna Odra Power Station is a coal-fired power station at Nowe Czarnowo near Gryfino in West Pomeranian Voivodeship, Poland. It consists of 8 units, 2 with 220 MW and 6 with 232 MW, which went in service between 1974 and 5 to 8 were awarded in 1977. Since 1993, Dolna Odra has gone through modernization process. In 2000, units 7 and 8 were equipped by new controls systems from Pavilion Technologies and ABB. Starting from October 2002, the flue gas from the units 5–8 is cleaned at the flue-gas desulfurization plant, built by Lurgi Lentjes.  PGE also plans to build two new natural gas-fired units with capacity of 432 MW each.

On 24 January 2010, an explosion of coal dust killed one employee and injured three. Part of a plant's coal supply system  
has been damaged.

See also 

 List of power stations in Poland
 List of tallest structures in Poland

References

Coal-fired power stations in Poland
Buildings and structures in West Pomeranian Voivodeship
Gryfino County